A sky burial is a Tibetan open-air excarnation funerary practice.

Sky burial may also refer to:

 Dakhma, a Zoroastrian open-air excarnation funerary practice
 Space burial, a space-age funerary practice involving launching cremated remains into space
 Sky Burial, a 2004 novel by Xue Xinran
 "Sky Burial" (song), by Ash

See also
 Burial (disambiguation)

Death